A LocalTalk-to-Ethernet Bridge is a network bridge that joins the physical layer of the AppleTalk networking used by previous generations of Apple Computer products to an Ethernet network. This was an important class of products in the late 1980s and early 1990s, before Ethernet support became universal on the Mac lineup.

Some LocalTalk-to-Ethernet Bridges only performed Appletalk bridging. Others were also able to bridge other protocols using ad-hoc standards. One example was the MacIP system that allowed LocalTalk-based Macs to send and receive TCP/IP (internet) packets using the bridges as a go-between.

Examples
Hardware devices:
 Asante: AsanteTalk
 Cayman Systems: GatorBox
 Compatible Systems: Ether Route/TCP, Ether Route II, RISC Router 3000E
 Dayna Communications: EtherPrint, EtherPrint Plus, EtherPrint-T, EtherPrint-T Plus
 Farallon: EtherPrint, EtherWave LocalTalk Adapter, InterRoute/5, StarRouter, EtherMac iPrint Adapter LT
 FOCUS Enhancements EtherLAN PRINT
Hayes Inter-bridge
 Kinetics: FastPath - in later years, available from Shiva Networks
 Sonic Systems: microPrint, microBridge TCP/IP
 Transware: EtherWay
 Tribe Computer Works: TribeStar
 Webster Computer Corporation: MultiGate, MultiPort Gateway, MultiPort/LT

Software in MacTCP era (<1995):
 Apple IP Gateway from Apple Computer
 SuperBridge/TCP from Sonic Systems
Software in Open Transport era (>1995):
 Internet Gateway from Vicomsoft
 IPNetRouter from Sustainable Softworks
 LocalTalk Bridge from Apple Computer
Other Software
 macipgw
 Netatalk

References

External links
Oxford University resource regarding DDP-IP Gateways
LocalTalk Bridge v2.1 download (CNET)
Sustainable Softworks IPNetRouter
Webster MultiPort/LT guide
Webster Computer Corporation Multiport Gateway - Software Version 4.7 & documentation
Asante AsantéTalk (Product Info)
Asante AsantéTalk (Online Shop)
Sonic MicroPrint Manual
Sonic MicroPrint Software
Usenet post regarding successful use of the AsanteTalk bridge with an Apple IIgs
macipgw project on Sourceforge

Apple Inc. hardware
Network protocols
Networking hardware
Physical layer protocols